Woodford is a town in Orangeburg County, South Carolina, United States. The population was 185 at the 2010 census.

Geography
Woodford is located at  (33.667720, -81.112088).

Demographics

As of the census of 2000, there were 196 people, 81 households, and 54 families residing in the town. The population density was 248.2 people per square mile (95.8/km2). There were 103 housing units at an average density of 130.5 per square mile (50.3/km2). The racial makeup of the town was 50.51% African American, 47.96% White,  1.02% from other races, and 0.51% from two or more races. Hispanic or Latino of any race were 1.53% of the population.

There were 81 households, out of which 23.5% had children under the age of 18 living with them, 48.1% were married couples living together, 13.6% had a female householder with no husband present, and 32.1% were non-families. 30.9% of all households were made up of individuals, and 19.8% had someone living alone who was 65 years of age or older. The average household size was 2.42 and the average family size was 3.00.

In the town, the population was spread out, with 22.4% under the age of 18, 7.7% from 18 to 24, 26.0% from 25 to 44, 25.5% from 45 to 64, and 18.4% who were 65 years of age or older. The median age was 41 years. For every 100 females, there were 90.3 males. For every 100 females age 18 and over, there were 76.7 males.

The median income for a household in the town was $24,792, and the median income for a family was $36,875. Males had a median income of $26,667 versus $19,375 for females. The per capita income for the town was $12,158. About 14.3% of families and 12.4% of the population were below the poverty line, including 10.4% of those under the age of eighteen and 31.6% of those 65 or over.

References

External links
Information about Woodford from Orangeburg County

Towns in Orangeburg County, South Carolina
Towns in South Carolina